Figureheads Compilation is the sixth full-length album released by the Japanese music group Ellegarden. It was released on July 2, 2007 under the Nettwerk label.

Track listing
 The Autumn Song- 3:03
 Red Hot - 2:41
 Stereoman - 3:34
 Raindrops - 3:39
 Supernova - 3:36
 Marry Me - 2:50
 Missing - 3:28
 Windy Day - 4:13
 Middle of Nowhere - 3:57
 I Hate It - 3:18

References 

Ellegarden albums
2007 compilation albums